Pope Gabriel may refer to:

 Pope Gabriel I of Alexandria, ruled in 910–920/1
 Pope Gabriel II of Alexandria, ruled in 1131–1145
 Pope Gabriel III of Alexandria, ruled in 1268–1271
 Pope Gabriel IV of Alexandria, ruled in 1370–1378
 Pope Gabriel V of Alexandria, ruled in 1408–1427
 Pope Gabriel VI of Alexandria, ruled in 1466–1475
 Pope Gabriel VII of Alexandria, ruled in 1525–1570
 Pope Gabriel VIII of Alexandria, ruled in 1587–1603